Farzad Mostashari, MD, ScM, is the former national coordinator for health information technology at the U.S. Department of Health and Human Services.

Currently Mostashari is CEO of Aledade, a company he founded in 2014.  Aledade provides services to independent primary care providers forming accountable care organizations.

Life
He was born in Richmond, Virginia, and raised in Iran, Mostashari moved to upstate New York at age 14.

Mostashari holds degrees from Yale University School of Medicine (MD, Medicine, 1996), Harvard T.H. Chan School of Public Health (MSc, Population Health, 1991), and Harvard University (AB, Biochemistry, 1989).

Career
Mostashari completed his residency in internal medicine at Massachusetts General Hospital.  He subsequently joined the Centers for Disease Control's Epidemiological Intelligence Service, where he investigated outbreaks of infectious disease.  He then joined the New York City Department of Health, where he launched the primary care information project under Thomas Frieden.  The project focused on accelerating the adoption of electronic health record systems as a means of improving primary care quality in New York City.  Following the passage of the HITECH act, David Blumenthal recruited Mostashari to serve as deputy national coordinator for health information technology in July 2009 and eventually succeeded him as national coordinator on 8 April 2011. Mostashari is credited with leading the design and implementation of stage I meaningful use.  In August 2013, he announced his resignation, and following his departure, became a visiting fellow at the Brookings Institution's Engelberg Center for Health Care Reform.  He used his time at Brookings to develop the ideas that he used to found Aledade.

See also
 Office of the National Coordinator for Health Information Technology

References

External links
 Farzad Mostashari on Twitter

1960s births
20th-century American physicians
21st-century American physicians
American health care chief executives
American people of Iranian descent
American public health doctors
Harvard School of Public Health alumni
Health informaticians
Living people
Obama administration personnel
Physicians from New York (state)
United States Department of Health and Human Services officials
Yale School of Medicine alumni
Office of the National Coordinator for Health Information Technology